The year 1872 in architecture involved some significant architectural events and new buildings.

Events
 Work begins on the building of the Church of the Holy Angels, Hoar Cross, Staffordshire, England, designed by George Frederick Bodley and Thomas Garner.

Buildings and structures

Buildings opened

July – The Albert Memorial in London, designed by Sir George Gilbert Scott, is opened by Queen Victoria.
December 12 – Church of San Agustin, Laredo, Texas, is opened
 The Ancoats Hospital, an enlargement of the existing building, in Manchester, England, designed by Lewis and Crawcroft, begins construction.

Buildings completed
 Basilica of Our Lady of the Pillar, Zaragoza, Aragon, Spain (nearly two hundred years after it was begun).
 St Mary Magdalene, Paddington, London, designed by George Edmund Street, originally completed.
 St. Matthew's German Evangelical Lutheran Church, Charleston, South Carolina, designed by John Henry Devereux, dedicated.
 The Egyptian Halls, a pioneering iron-framed commercial building in Glasgow designed by Alexander Thomson.
 Palacio Federal Legislativo, Caracas, Venezuela, designed by Luciano Urdaneta.

Awards
 RIBA Royal Gold Medal – Friedrich von Schmidt.
 Grand Prix de Rome, architecture: Louis Bernier.

Births
January 8 – Antonio Palacios, Spanish architect (died 1945)
January 20 – Julia Morgan, California-based architect (died 1957)
January 23 – Jože Plečnik, Slovene architect (died 1957)
February 9 – Charles Klauder, American architect known for university buildings (died 1938)
May 26 – Zachary Taylor Davis, Chicago architect (died 1946)
Clarence Perry, American town planner (died 1944)

Deaths
January 13 – William Scamp, English architect (born 1801)
February 20 – Andrew Petrie, builder, architect and Australian pioneer (born 1798)
June 22 – Frederick Marrable, first Chief Architect of the Metropolitan Board of Works (London) (born 1819)
December 14 – Robert Richardson Banks, English architect, partner of Charles Barry, Jr. (born 1812)
December 17 – William Slater, London-based architect (born 1819)

References

Architecture
Years in architecture
19th-century architecture